Anton Igorevich Kupchin (born 3 April 1990) is a Russian former professional football player.

Club career
He made his Russian Football National League debut for FC SKA-Energiya Khabarovsk on 24 June 2008 in a game against FC KAMAZ Naberezhnye Chelny. He played 7 seasons in the FNL for SKA.

In September 2019, Kupchin joined FC Favorit-VD Kafa which he played five league games for before leaving.

References

External links
 
 
 

1990 births
Sportspeople from Khabarovsk
Living people
Russian footballers
Russian expatriate footballers
Association football midfielders
FC SKA-Khabarovsk players
FC Sakhalin Yuzhno-Sakhalinsk players
FC Lokomotiv Moscow players
FC TSK Simferopol players
Russian expatriate sportspeople in Armenia
Expatriate footballers in Armenia
Crimean Premier League players